The Ziarat Valley (Urduوا دى زىارت) is a valley in Ziarat District, in Balochistan province, Pakistan. The area of the Ziarat village is about 10 km2. A large forest of juniper trees, part of the East Afghan montane conifer forests, covers much of the valley, although it is threatened due to overuse and climate change.

References 

Valleys of Balochistan (Pakistan)